Princess Sumaya University for Technology (PSUT), established in 1991, is a specialized, Non-governmental, Non-profit, Jordanian university, owned by the leading applied research centre in Jordan, the Royal Scientific Society (RSS). PSUT's area of specialization is IT, Communications and Electronics. As a nonprofit institution, PSUT embraces both the public and private sectors, but while akin to public universities in its mission, it is more aligned to the private sector in drive and spirit.

PSUT is located in Amman, Jordan, offering an array of ICT related courses. It currently offers B.Sc. degrees in Computer Science, Computer Graphics and Animation, Software Engineering, Electronics Engineering, Computer Engineering, Communication Engineering, Energy and Electrical Power Engineering, Management Information Systems, Administration of business, Accounting, Business Information Technology and E-Marketing and Social Media.

The university campus underwent major renovation and expansion in late 2004. Labs were upgraded with new equipment and computers. The university library was expanded, and a new collection of IT related books was added.

The university has a Sun Microsystems lab, mainly used in Java courses, and Unix courses on Sun SPARC based machines.

Also, PSUT has a Rubicon Lab, This Lab is used for teaching animation and video game development courses. It was established by partnership with Rubicon Group Holding Company for the animation industry and video games.

An Oracle incubator lab was also recently established on the campus, with the goal of familiarizing students with Oracle technologies, and to remove the stereo-typical view of Oracle as only being a Database company.

PSUT has recently established a regional entrepreneurship center, named: Queen Rania Center for Entrepreneurship, to help in fostering talent and transforming knowledge in Jordan and the region into a socio-economic impact.

King Abdullah II School For Electrical Engineering 
The King Abdullah II School for Electrical Engineering at Princess Sumaya University for Technology consists currently of Four departments: 
 Electronics Engineering Department that was founded in 1994.
 Communication Engineering Department that was founded in 2005.
 Computer Engineering Department that was founded in 2002.
 Energy and Electrical Power Engineering Department that was founded in 2011.
 Networks and Information Security Engineering Department that was founded in 2014.
The School has 850 students currently enrolled in the Four undergraduate degree programs.

The King Hussein School for IT
The King Hussein School for Information Technology at Princess Sumaya University for Technology (PSUT) had been established since the  academic year of 2005–2006. This new establishment is  inline with PSUT's master plan to develop and improve its facilities and faculties. The faculty consists of four academic departments:
  Computer Science Department established in 1991.
 Computer Graphics and Animation established in 2006.
 Software Engineering established in 2011.
 Data Science and Artificial Intelligence.

The King Hussein School for Information Technology  currently offers a Bachelor of Science (BS) in Computer Science, Computer Graphics and Animation, Software Engineering and Master of Science in computer Science and Security of information systems and digital crimes.
Since PSUT was established in 1991, over 1,200 students, graduated with a BS degree in Computer Science in addition to the 100 that graduated this year.and Data Science and Artificial Intelligence.

King Talal Business School
The King Talal Business School at PSUT had been established in 2008, This school consists currently of four departments:
 Business Information Technology
Department established in 2015
 Management Information Systems Department established in 2008.
 Administration of business Department established in 2008.
 Accounting Department established in 2011.
 Digital marketing Department established in 2012.
King Talal Business School has a plan to launch new B.Sc. majors in finance and other disciplines in the coming few years.

The University Development Office

The University Development Office (UDO) at Princess Sumaya University for Technology (PSUT) was launched in early 2006. It was established to assure the continuation and development of a journey of excellence in the field of Information and Communication Technology (ICT). The UDO administers and manages fundraising initiatives with students, parents, alumni, friends, foundations, and corporations. The funds help the university in developing its academic programs, student scholarships, professorship, research, renovation projects, and new facilities.

The Queen Rania Center for Entrepreneurship

The establishment of Queen Rania Center for Entrepreneurship is an integral part of the expansion plan of PSUT. The idea was to name the Center after a prominent Arab dignitary known for his/her distinguished role in developing entrepreneurship. Thus, work towards launching the Queen Rania Center for Entrepreneurship (QRCE) started in October 2004.

References

 
Entrepreneurship organizations
Educational institutions established in 1991
Education in Amman
1991 establishments in Jordan
Organisations based in Jordan with royal patronage